El Puesto may refer to:

 El Puesto (Santa María), a village and municipality in Catamarca Province, Argentina
 El Puesto (Tinogasta), a village and municipality in Catamarca Province, Argentina